Sr2, SR2 and variants may refer to

 .sr2, a filename extension for Raw image format
 Manx SR2 a 1970 American kit car
 Minolta SR-2, a camera
 Saints Row 2, a computer game
 Space Rangers 2: Dominators, a computer game
 SR-2 Veresk, a submachine gun
 VR Class Sr2, a Finnish electric locomotive
 Normandy SR-2, a spacecraft from Mass Effect 2
 Ormazd, one of the quadrangles of the moon Rhea
 State Route 2 or State Road 2; see List of highways numbered 2
 SR2, a competition class of the FIA Sportscar Championship
 SR2, the second radio station of the Saarländischer Rundfunk launched 1953
 SR2, a high specification version of the Ford Laser